Hymenocallis crassifolia  is a plant in the Amaryllidaceae. Common name is coastal Carolina spiderlily. It is known from wetlands in North Carolina, South Carolina, Georgia and Florida. It is distinguished from other species of the genus by its stiff, coriaceous, liguliform leaves.

References

crassifolia
Flora of the Southeastern United States
Plants described in 1821
Flora without expected TNC conservation status